The Coronation Chair, known historically as St Edward's Chair or King Edward's Chair, is an ancient wooden chair on which British monarchs sit when they are invested with regalia and crowned at their coronations. It was commissioned in 1296 by King Edward I to contain the coronation stone of Scotland—known as the Stone of Destiny—which had been captured from the Scots who kept it at Scone Abbey. The chair was named after Edward the Confessor, and was previously kept in his shrine at Westminster Abbey.

History
The high-backed, Gothic-style armchair was carved from oak at some point between the summer of 1297 and March 1300 by the carpenter Walter of Durham. At first, the king ordered the chair to be made of bronze, but he changed his mind and decided it should be made of timber. The chair is the oldest dated piece of English furniture made by a known artist. Since the 14th century, all crowned English and British monarchs have been seated in the chair at the moment of coronation, with the exception of Queen Mary II, who was crowned on a copy of the chair. Monarchs used to sit on the Stone of Scone itself until a wooden platform was added in the 17th century.

Gilded lions added in the 16th century form the legs to the chair; they were all replaced in 1727. One of the four lions was given a new head for the coronation of George IV in 1821. The chair itself was originally gilded, painted and inlaid with glass mosaics, traces of which are visible upon inspection of the chair, especially on the back where outlines of foliage, birds and animals have managed to survive. A lost image of a king, maybe Edward the Confessor or Edward I, with his feet resting on a lion was also painted on the back. Today, its appearance is of aged and brittle wood.

In the 18th century, tourists could sit on the chair for a small payment to one of the vergers. Early tourists and choirboys of the abbey carved their initials and other graffiti into the chair, and the corner posts have been acutely damaged by souvenir hunters. Sir Gilbert Scott, the Gothic revival architect and antiquary, described the chair as "a magnificent piece of decoration, but sadly mutilated".

At 5:40pm on 11 June 1914, the chair was the object of a bomb attack thought to have been organised by the Suffragettes. A corner of the chair was broken off in the explosion. Although it was strong enough to shake the abbey walls and loud enough to be heard from inside the Houses of Parliament, none of the 70 people in the abbey at the time were injured, and the Coronation Chair was faithfully restored.

Over the eight centuries of its existence, the chair has only been removed from Westminster Abbey twice. The first time was for the ceremony in Westminster Hall when Oliver Cromwell was inducted as Lord Protector of the Commonwealth of England. The second was during the Second World War when, concerned about the risk of it being damaged or destroyed by German air raids, the decision was made to move it out of London. On 24 August 1939, the Stone of Scone was moved out of the way and the chair was loaded on a truck and, with two detectives accompanying the driver, it was driven to Gloucester Cathedral where the Dean and the Cathedral Architect signed for its receipt. The next day, five carpenters arrived to shore up the roof of a vaulted recess in the cathedral's crypt with timber supports. Once they had finished their work, the chair was moved into the recess. As it also provided the best protected location, the cathedral's 13th-century bog-oak effigy of Robert Curthose was placed on the chair. Sandbags were then used to seal off the recess. The chair remained there for the duration of the war. Meanwhile the chair used for the coronation of Mary II was relocated from Westminster Abbey to Winchester Cathedral for safekeeping.

On Christmas Day 1950, Scottish nationalists broke into Westminster Abbey and stole the Stone of Scone, damaging both the chair and the stone. It was recovered in time for Queen Elizabeth II's coronation in 1953. In 1996, the stone was returned to Scotland, where it is kept at Edinburgh Castle on the proviso that it be returned to England for use at coronations.

The Coronation Chair is highly protected, and leaves its secure location—on a plinth in St George's Chapel in the nave—only when it is carried into the theatre of coronation near the High Altar of the abbey. Between 2010 and 2012, the chair was cleaned and restored by a team of experts in full view of the public at the abbey. In early 2023, a further programme of restoration and conservation was undertaken in preparation for the coronation of Charles III and Camilla.

Other chairs used at the coronation

Other chairs are also used throughout the coronation ceremony. Chairs of Estate for the sovereign and consort are placed on the south side of the sanctuary, and these are used during the first part of the liturgy, prior to the sovereign's anointing and crowning with St Edward's Crown. Then, for a part of the service called the enthronement, and for the homage which follows it, the monarch is placed not in the Coronation Chair, but in a throne on a dais in the middle of the transept. On occasions when the wife of a king—a queen consort—is crowned, a similar throne is provided for her so that she can be seated next to the king but at a lower level.

Unlike the Coronation Chair, these other chairs and thrones tend to be made new for each coronation. Afterwards, they have often been placed in the Throne Rooms of royal palaces. The Chair of Estate from the 1953 coronation can be found in the Throne Room of Buckingham Palace, along with those of George VI and his consort Queen Elizabeth. The 1953 throne is kept in the Garter Throne Room of Windsor Castle; the thrones of King Edward VII and Queen Alexandra are in the Ballroom at Buckingham Palace. Those of George V and Queen Mary may be seen in the Throne Room at the Palace of Holyroodhouse in Edinburgh.

See also
Westminster Stone theory
Chair of St Peter
List of chairs

Notes

References

External links
History of the Coronation Chair at Westminster Abbey

Coronations of British monarchs
Individual thrones
English royalty
Edward I of England
Westminster Abbey
Material culture of royal courts